In military terms, 157th Division or 157th Infantry Division may refer to:

 157th Division (People's Republic of China)
 157th Infantry Division (France)
 157th Mountain Division (German, World War II)
 Italian 157th Garrison Division
 157th Division (Imperial Japanese Army)